Peter Joseph Handcock (17 February 1868 – 27 February 1902) was an Australian-born Veterinary Lieutenant and convicted war criminal who served in the Bushveldt Carbineers during the Boer War in South Africa.

After a court martial, Handcock (along with Harry "Breaker" Morant) was convicted and executed for the murders of nine Boer POWs and three other civilians.  

His execution, "which had been carried out without the knowledge and consent of the Australian government", was and remains a controversial issue in Australia.

Life
Peter Joseph Handcock was born at Peel, near Bathurst, New South Wales to William Handcock (1830–1874), and Bridget Handcock, née Martin (1830–1881) on 17 February 1868 

He was apprenticed to a blacksmith at age 12, and later worked as a blacksmith with the Railways Department.

He married his 17-year-old cousin Bridget Alice Mary Martin on 15 July 1888, and they had two sons and a daughter.

Military service
He served in South Africa with the 1st New South Wales Mounted Rifles, and was promoted to Farrier-Sergeant.

When the NSWMR returned home he obtained a commission in the Bushveldt Carbineers as Veterinary and Transport Officer.
In early August 1901, Handcock executed an unarmed, wounded Boer prisoner, Floris Visser. Two weeks later, he fatally shot a South African missionary, Reverend Daniel Heese, possibly out of the fear that he would report his crimes.

Handcock also organized and participated in the executions of 8 surrendering Boers. "We are justified in shooting everything in sight," Handcock said to a fellow trooper.

On 7 September 1901, Hancock and Morant heard that three Boers were approaching their camp. They met the three with two other soldiers. The Boers were Roelf van Staden and his two sons, 16-year-old Roelf Jr. and 12-year-old Chris, who was very sick from a fever.

Morant quietly told his men that when the Stadens reached a clearing, to wait until he said “lay down your arms,” then shoot the three after they calmed down. When Handcock and the two other soldiers pointed their rifles at the Stadens ready to fire, the family looked at them confused and scared. They calmed down after Morant gave his command, and were then suddenly shot as he had planned.

Execution
Handcock and Morant were court-martialled, convicted, and executed in Pretoria by a firing squad drawn from the Queen's Own Cameron Highlanders on 27 February 1902 on murder charges for shooting nine Boer POWs. Handcock was also found guilty of manslaughter for his role in the illegal execution of Visser. 

While the defendants were found guilty of killing these POWs and civilians, they were acquitted of murdering Daniel Heese. However, in 1929, it was revealed by George Witton in a letter to James Francis Thomas that Handcock had confessed to Witton of murdering Heese shortly after he was acquitted.

Petitions for review of convictions and sentences

In 2010, petitions were submitted for the review of the convictions of Handcock and his colleagues.

See also 
 Court martial of Breaker Morant
 Breaker Morant (play)
 Breaker Morant (film)
 Pardons for Morant, Handcock and Witton

Footnotes

References
 Probate Jurisdiction, The Sydney Morning Herald, (Thursday, 23 June 1904), p.8.
 The Bushveldt Carbineers and the Pietersburg Light Horse by William (Bill) Woolmore (2002, Slouch Hat Publications Australia) 
 Unkles, James, Ready, Aim, Fire : Major James Francis Thomas, the Fourth Victim in the Execution of Lieutenant Harry "Breaker" Morant, Sid Harta Publishers, (Glen Waverley), 2018. 
 The Australian Boer War Memorial: Lieutenant Peter Handcock.
 Wallace, R.L., "Handcock, Peter Joseph (1868–1902)", pp.185-185 in B. Nairn, G. Serle, and C. Cunneen (eds), Australian Dictionary of Biography: Volume 9: 1891-1939, Gil-Las, Melbourne University Press, (Carlton), 1983.

External links
 For an Australian War Memorial: Peter Handcock
 Lieutenant Peter Handcock

1868 births
1902 deaths
Australian Army soldiers
Australian military personnel of the Second Boer War
British colonial army officers
Australian mass murderers
Australian murderers of children
Australian people convicted of murder
Australian people convicted of war crimes
Australian people executed abroad
British Army personnel who were court-martialled
Executed Australian people
Executed military personnel
People convicted of murder by the British military
People convicted of manslaughter
People executed by the British military by firing squad
People executed for war crimes
People from New South Wales
20th-century executions by the United Kingdom
Deaths by firearm in South Africa
Executed mass murderers